Maine Jeena Seekh Liya is a 1982 Bollywood romantic drama film directed by Bhisham Kohli.

Cast
 Mohan Bhakri
 Dulari
 Abhi Bhattacharya
 Kajal Kiran
 Shakti Kapoor
 Zarina Wahab
 Birbal
 Rajni Bala
 Geeta Behl

Soundtrack
"Chehra Kanwal Hai Aap Ka" - Suresh Wadkar
"Chehra Kanwal Hai Aap Ka" (sad) - Suresh Wadkar
"Kal Sham Ko Milenge" - Anuradha Paudwal, Shailendra Singh
"Luk Chhup Jaana Makai Da Daana" - Anuradha Paudwal
"Pal Do Pal Ki Zindagi Mein" v1 - Amit Kumar
"Pal Do Pal Ki Zindagi Mein" v2 - Amit Kumar
"Pal Do Pal Ki Zindagi Mein" v3 - Amit Kumar
"Pal Do Pal Ki Zindagi Mein" v4 - Amit Kumar
"Sasurji Mile Hain Pyar Se" - Shailendra Singh, Alka Yagnik
"Zara Zara Tu Pyar Kar" - Salma Agha

References

External links
 

1982 films
Films scored by Nadeem–Shravan
1980s Hindi-language films
Indian romantic drama films